Sachsenhagen is a Samtgemeinde ("collective municipality") in the district of Schaumburg, in Lower Saxony, Germany. Its seat is in the town Sachsenhagen.

The Samtgemeinde Sachsenhagen consists of the following municipalities:
 Auhagen 
 Hagenburg
 Sachsenhagen
 Wölpinghausen

Samtgemeinden in Lower Saxony